Ghar Ki Izzat is a 1994 Hindi-language drama film, produced by Kanu Chauhan under the Raj Sun Films banner and directed by Kalpataru. It stars Jeetendra, Rishi Kapoor, Kader Khan, Asha Parekh, Juhi Chawla, Anita Raj , and music composed by Amar-Utpal. The film is a remake of the Bengali  film Bhangagara (1954).

Plot
Ram Kumar (Kader Khan) is the eldest of four sons in his family. He has brought up his three younger brothers, Shyam (Kanu Chauhan), Sohan (Jeetendra), and Mohan (Rishi Kapoor), with love and fatherly care, together with his wife, Sita (Asha Parekh). Sita has a younger sister, Gita (Juhi Chawla), who also lives with them. Gita is a child-widow. Ram does not approve of anyone referring to Gita as such. Ram decides that it is time for Shyam and Sohan to get married, and he picks their brides for them. Shyam marries Mona, and Sohan marries Sheela (Anita Raj). With the entry of these two new wives, the equilibrium of love and respect is disrupted, as both want more control and demand more respect, which leads to clashes and quarrels all round, and changes in the lives of all the inhabitants. Eventually, in the end, everyone lives happily together and Mohan and Gita get married.

Cast

Kader Khan as Ram Kumar
Asha Parekh as Seeta
Rishi Kapoor as Mohan Kumar
Juhi Chawla as Geeta
Jeetendra as Dr. Sohan Kumar
Anita Raj as Sheela 
Kanu Chauhan as Shyam Kumar
Sonika Gill as Mona
Gulshan Grover as Sheethal 
Om Prakash as Sheethal's father
Satyendra Kapoor as Din Dayal 
Chandrashekhar
Satish Shah
Asrani as Bhola
Birbal as Munshi Lal
Bindu as Rani
Shammi as Bua

Soundtrack

References

External links
 

1990s Hindi-language films
Hindi remakes of Bengali films
Hindi remakes of Tamil films
Films directed by Kalpataru
Indian drama films